Magdalena Khristova (born 25 February 1977) is a Bulgarian athlete. She formerly specialized in the long jump, but turned to the 100 metres since 2002.

She had a personal best jump of 6.94 metres, achieved in June 1996 in Kalamata. Over 100 m her personal best time is 11.39 seconds, achieved in July 2005 in Sofia.

Achievements

External links

EAA profile

1977 births
Living people
Bulgarian female sprinters
Bulgarian female long jumpers
21st-century Bulgarian women
20th-century Bulgarian women